LandPaths or Land Partners through stewardship is an organization formed in 1996 to foster a love of the land in Sonoma County, California.  The organization owns open space preserves throughout Sonoma County, and encourages outdoor experiences where people can learn to understand and appreciate natural environments.

Locations 
 Andy’s Unity Park Community Garden in southwest Santa Rosa, California
 Bayer Farm in the Roseland neighborhood of Santa Rosa
 Rancho Mark West learning environment with organic garden, historic barn, creek, and demonstration forest in the hills above Santa Rosa
 Bohemia Ecological Preserve  in the western hills of Occidental, California
 Ocean Song  in western Sonoma County
 Riddell Preserve  of diverse habitat above the west Dry Creek valley in Healdsburg, California
 Fitch Mountain  open space preserve on Fitch Mountain, owned by the City of Healdsburg and stewarded by LandPaths
 Healdsburg Ridge Open Space Preserve  of wetlands, oak woodlands, chaparral, and grasslands owned by the City of Healdsburg and stewarded by LandPaths

Activities 
LandPaths' public outings visit and enjoy the open spaces, farms and parks-in-development that have been protected by Sonoma County Agricultural Preservation and Open Space District. The LandPaths outdoor day camp provides Santa Rosa elementary school students the opportunity to engage in nature walks, hikes, journaling, and observations of natural processes, plant life, and animal life in local open spaces. LandPaths' Owl Camp host hundreds of children aged 6 to 13 each summer at Rancho Mark West. Older children are encouraged to participate in kayaking and backpacking Treks for Teens. Teenagers are encouraged to become stewards of the land removing invasive plants, repairing trails, helping to reduce fire risks, planting oaks, and cleaning up creeks.

References

External links 
 

Nature conservation organizations based in the United States
Environmental organizations based in the San Francisco Bay Area